Erik Ulfsby (born 2 October 1970) is a Norwegian actor, stage instructor and theatre director.

He was born in Oslo, and educated at the Norwegian National Academy of Theatre. As an actor, he has performed at Trøndelag Teater (Trondheim), Den Nationale Scene (Bergen) and Teatret Vårt (Molde), and has worked with radio, television and film. As a theatre director, he received the Hedda Award in 2006 (for Bollywood Ibsen – Fruen fra Det indiske hav) and in 2009 (for Jungelboka). He was appointed artistic director at Det Norske Teatret from 2011.

References

1970 births
Living people
Male actors from Oslo
Norwegian male stage actors
Norwegian male television actors
Norwegian theatre directors
Theatre people from Oslo